This is a list of Wikipedia articles on topics of numeral system and "numeric representations"

See also: computer numbering formats and number names.

Arranged by base
 Radix, radix point, mixed radix, base (mathematics)
 Unary numeral system (base 1)
 
 Binary numeral system (base 2)
 Negative base numeral system (base −2)
 Ternary numeral system numeral system (base 3)
 Balanced ternary numeral system (base 3)
 Negative base numeral system (base −3)
 Quaternary numeral system (base 4)
 Quater-imaginary base (base 2)
 Quinary numeral system (base 5)
 
 Senary numeral system (base 6)
 Septenary numeral system (base 7)
 Octal numeral system (base 8)
 Nonary (novenary) numeral system (base 9)
 Decimal (denary) numeral system (base 10)
 
 Negative base numeral system (base −10)
 Duodecimal (dozenal) numeral system (base 12)
 Hexadecimal numeral system (base 16)
 Vigesimal numeral system (base 20)
 Sexagesimal numeral system (base 60)

Arranged by culture

Other

 
 
 
 
 
 
 
 
 
 

Numeral system topics